The Vis or Vis 35 (Polish designation Pistolet wz. 35 Vis; German designation 9 mm Pistole 35(p), or simply the Radom in English sources and Vis wz. 35 in Poland) is a Polish 9×19mm caliber, single-action, semi-automatic pistol. Its design was inspired by the Browning Hi-Power pistol designed by American John Moses Browning and Belgian Dieudonné Saive and produced by Fabrique Nationale in Herstal, Belgium.

Production of the Vis began in 1935 at the Fabryka Broni factory in Radom, Poland, and was adopted as the standard handgun of the Polish Army the following year. The pistol was valued by the Germans following the invasion of Poland in 1939 which marked the start of World War II, and was eventually issued to German paratroopers. The Vis is highly prized among collectors of firearms.

History

The pistol bears many internal and external similarities to the famous Colt M1911A1, to the point that some parts are almost interchangeable (i.e. frame, main spring, trigger, screws in the exact same places and kept in the same (non-metric) diameter etc.) But the Colt M1911 resemblance is much more striking. It operated on the short-recoil principle, with the barrel being cammed down and away from the locking lugs in the slide.

This later John Moses Browning design, unlike the M1911, was not cammed by a link, but by a ledge of sorts, which contacts a portion of the barrel and forces it down as it is moved rearward with the slide by the recoil force. It shares some similarities to the Spanish Ruby .45 ACP. Like the 9mm Browning GP, a characteristic feature was a trapezoid grip shape, wider at the bottom, offering good ergonomics and firm grip. On the right side grip cover, the Polish copy pistol had letters VIS in a triangle, on the left side—FB (for Fabryka Broni—"Arms Factory"). The handgun was prepared in late 1930, and at the beginning of 1931 the first pistols were ready for testing. Initially it was named WiS (an acronym of the Polish designers' names), later the name was changed to Vis, meaning "force" in Latin, with the wz. abbreviation for wzór ("model").

The tests proved that the handgun was very accurate and stable (due to its size and mass, most stresses are absorbed and not passed on the shooter), while at the same time remaining reliable after firing more than 6,000 rounds. The Vis was generally regarded as one of the best military pistols of that period.

Production started in the state armory Fabryka Broni in Radom in late 1935, and the following year it was introduced as the standard weapon of Polish infantry and cavalry officers. Successively, other units were to be equipped, and by 1942 all other handguns were scheduled to be withdrawn from service. By mid-1938, it was introduced to the armored and air forces. Before the invasion of Poland, approximately 49,400 (out of 90,000 ordered) were delivered to the army.

In addition to the 9mm, there was also a small information series of .45 ACP version, with 7-round magazine, but they were not produced in greater series. Most probably only for the Argentinian competition the wooden stock-shoulder was issued but it has not survived. A .22 LR variant also existed, but no details are known, and its series was not produced in great numbers.

After the Polish defeat in 1939, the Germans took over the Radom Armory and continued production of the Vis under the new name of 9 mm Pistole 645(p), which was for some reason often rendered as P 35(p) (the suffix "p" means "polnisch") (the German pistols of the first series had inscriptions VIS Mod.35 and P.35(p) on the left side). Up to 1945, between 312,000 and 380,000 were produced and used by the German paratroopers and military police.

Fearing that Polish technicians working in the armory might supply the Home Army with the weapons, the Germans moved production of barrels and final assembly to Steyr-Daimler-Puch in the "Ostmark" (Austria). However, underground production of Vis barrels was started in Warsaw and Kielce-based Huta Ludwików, and several hundred Vis pistols were assembled of parts smuggled from the factory, delivered to the Home Army and used extensively during the Warsaw Uprising, among others.

Vis pistols made after 1939 were issued in four different series, each with small modifications to simplify production. In late 1944, all production was moved to the Steyr works in Austria, where the last simplified model of the fourth series was produced (with no inscriptions at all, apart from bnz signature). The Vis remained in production until April 1945. Generally, the wartime Vis were of much lower quality than the original, and further declined towards the end of the war.

After the war, production of the pistol was not continued, as the Army of the People's Republic of Poland used the Soviet TT-33 pistol, produced in the former Fabryka Broni in Radom due to Warsaw Pact regulations. It was considered much inferior to the Vis, especially in ergonomics and reliability, but political considerations and Soviet influence were decisive.

In August 1997, the Łucznik Arms Factory in Radom reintroduced the Vis pistol and produced a small series of some 27 pistols on the basis of the original plans and specifications, mainly for the US collectors' market. But it differed from the original pre-war pistols with the shape of the rear sight notch and the Eagle on the slide. In 2010 another short series was manufactured. In 2012 IWA Radom Factory has presented the piece dated 2010 that was chromium coated instead of blued.

In December 2017, FB Radom's chairman, Adam Suliga, confirmed to the Polish magazine MILMAG that the Vis would be returning to production, and is planned to be available for retail in the second half of 2018. This will not be a single commemorative series, but rather, according to MILMAG, FB Radom reportedly hope to continually offer the wz.35 for the export market.

Overview
The Vis pistol is a single-action, hammer-fired, locked-breech design. The control on the slide is a decocking mechanism that releases the hammer while camming the firing pin up into the slide. There is a grip safety blocking the sear unless fully compressed, but the control in the same position as a thumb safety on a Browning Hi-Power or M1911-style pistol is not a safety.

The take-down lever is used to lock the slide back (as the Browning Hi-Power safety is used) during disassembly to allow removal of the slide release lever. In later variants, this lever is omitted and the slide must be manually aligned to remove the slide release lever. Once the slide and frame are aligned (by the disassembly lever or manually), the recoil guide is pulled forward to release the slide release lever and allow it to drop free. The slide will then be free to run forward and be removed from the frame.

The magazine catch is to the rear of the trigger guard and not at the heel of the grip in the typical European fashion of the time. A pistol lanyard is installed in the heel position for pistol retention. There is no magazine safety.

Users 
  - Standard issue sidearm of the Polish Army from 1935 to 1939, later they were used by Polish Underground, and also by the Polish post-war independence and anti-communist underground.
  - Factory captured in World War II, used primarily by the Fallschirmjäger.
  Italian Partisans - Captured from German soldiers.
 - Captured from German soldiers and used by resistance fighters.

References

Bibliography

External links

Semi-automatic pistols of Poland
World War II infantry weapons of Poland
World War II infantry weapons of Germany
Polish inventions
Science and technology in Poland
9mm Parabellum semi-automatic pistols
World War II infantry weapons
1911 platform
Military equipment introduced in the 1930s